The People's Assembly of Gagauzia (Gagauziyanin Halk Topluşu, Adunarea Populară a UTA Găgăuzia, Народное Собрание Гагаузии) is the representative and legislative body of the Gagauzia, an autonomous territorial unit of Moldova.

Composition
The People's Assembly consists of 35 deputies, elected for a term of four years, in single-mandate territorial constituencies, on the basis of universal, equal and direct suffrage with secret and free voting.

Members

Chairmen 
The work of the National Assembly is headed by the President of the People's Assembly of Gagauzia and the Presidium of the National Assembly. Below is a list of office-holders:

External links

History of Gagauzia

Politics of Moldova
Gagauzia